ExpressVPN is a VPN service offered by the British Virgin Islands-registered company Express Technologies Ltd. The software is marketed as a privacy and security tool that encrypts users' web traffic and masks their IP addresses.

As of September 2021, ExpressVPN is owned by Kape Technologies and reportedly has 4 million users.

History
ExpressVPN's parent company, Express VPN International Ltd, was founded in 2009 by Peter Burchhardt and Dan Pomerantz, two serial entrepreneurs who were also Wharton School alumni. The parent company does business as ExpressVPN.

On January 25, 2016, ExpressVPN announced that it would soon roll out an upgraded CA certificate. Also in December, ExpressVPN released open source leak testing tools on GitHub.

In July 2017, ExpressVPN announced in an open letter that Apple had removed all VPN apps from its App Store in China, a revelation that was later picked up by The New York Times and other outlets. In response to questions from U.S. Senators, Apple stated it had removed 674 VPN apps from the App Store in China in 2017 at the request of the Chinese government. In December, ExpressVPN came into the spotlight in relation to the investigation of the assassination of Russian ambassador to Turkey, Andrei Karlov. Turkish investigators seized an ExpressVPN server which they say was used to delete relevant information from the assassin's Gmail and Facebook accounts. Turkish authorities were unable to find any logs to aid their investigation, which the company said verified its claim that it did not store user activity or connection logs, adding; "while it's unfortunate that security tools like VPNs can be abused for illicit purposes, they are critical for our safety and the preservation of our right to privacy online. ExpressVPN is fundamentally opposed to any efforts to install 'backdoors' or attempts by governments to otherwise undermine such technologies."

In December 2019, ExpressVPN became a founding member of the VPN Trust Initiative, an advocacy group for online safety of consumers.

In May 2020, the company released a new protocol it developed for ExpressVPN called Lightway, designed to improve connectivity speeds and reduce power consumption. In October, Yale Privacy Lab founder Sean O'Brien joined the ExpressVPN Digital Security Lab to conduct original research in the areas of privacy and cybersecurity.

On September 13, 2021, it was reported that ExpressVPN had been acquired by Kape Technologies, an LSE-listed digital privacy and security company. At the time of the acquisition, ExpressVPN reportedly had over 3 million users. ExpressVPN announced in September 2021 that they would remain a separate service from existing Kape brands. In September, ExpressVPN CIO Daniel Gericke paid a $335,000 fine for previously carrying out computer network exploitation on behalf of the U.A.E government without having a valid export license from the US government.

On April 28, 2022, Indian Computer Emergency Response Team (CERT-In) under the Ministry of Electronics and Information Technology issued a new directive that asked the VPN providers to collect and store user data for up to five years. In response to the new VPN rules that require private network providers to store user information, ExpressVPN announced it will move its India-based servers to Singapore and the UK. On June 2, 2022, ExpressVPN officially announced that it "refuses to participate in the Indian government's attempts to limit internet freedom."

Features
ExpressVPN has released apps for Windows, macOS, iOS, Android, Linux, and routers. The apps use a 4096-bit CA, AES-256-CBC encryption, and TLSv1.2 to secure user traffic. Available VPN protocols include Lightway, OpenVPN (with TCP/UDP), SSTP, L2TP/IPSec, and PPTP.

The software also features a Smart DNS feature called MediaStreamer, to add VPN capabilities to devices that do not support them, and a router app, allowing the VPN to be set up on a router, bypassing unsupported devices such as gaming consoles.

ExpressVPN is incorporated in the British Virgin Islands, a privacy-friendly country that has no data retention laws, and is a separate legal jurisdiction to the United Kingdom.

ExpressVPN's parent company also develops leak testing tools, which enable users to determine if their VPN provider is leaking network traffic, DNS, or true IP addresses while connected to the VPN, such as when switching from a wireless to a wired internet connection.

In December 2021, ExpressVPN modified its product to protect against Log4Shell, updating its VPN to automatically block all outgoing traffic on ports used by LDAP.

In January 2022, ExpressVPN launched Parallel Connections, a backend feature which simultaneously runs multiple methods of connecting a user to a given server, automatically picking the one that connects a user first.

ExpressVPN launched Aircove, a Wi-Fi 6 router that includes a built-in VPN, in September 2022. Aircove permits speeds up to 1,200 Mbps (600 Mbps for 2.4GHz and 1,200 Mbps for 5GHz), covers areas up to 1,600 sq feet, and offers a quad-core 64-bit processor.

TrustedServer
In April 2019, ExpressVPN announced that all their VPN servers ran solely on random-access memory (RAM),  without the need of hard disk drives. In theory, as soon as a computer is shut down, all information on the server vanishes and cannot be recovered; the next time the server reboots, a fresh version of the VPN infrastructure is spawned. This was the first example in the VPN industry for such a server security setup, and was referred to as TrustedServer.

In February 2022, ExpressVPN announced a $100,000 bug bounty for anyone who was able to hack its in-house technology, TrustedServer.

As of August 2022, ExpressVPN's server network covered 94 countries.

Lightway protocol
Lightway is ExpressVPN's open source VPN protocol. Launched in 2020, it is similar to the WireGuard protocol, but uses wolfSSL encryption to improve speed on embedded devices such as routers and smartphones. It does not run in the operating system's kernel, but is lightweight to support auditing. It is reportedly 2.5x as fast as OpenVPN and other older protocols, improves reliability by 40%, and supports TCP and UDP.

In August 2021, ExpressVPN announced the full public release of Lightway as well as full open-sourcing of Lightway’s code.

Research
In 2020, ExpressVPN announced its new digital security research initiative Digital Security Lab, which investigates digital rights and security issues while educating consumers.

In 2021, Digital Security Lab released a new report that examined data collection practices in apps for opioid addiction and recovery. Research found that the large majority of all these apps provided third parties, including Facebook, Stripe, Inc., and Google, access to user data. In a similar 2021 study, Digital Security Lab analyzed 450 apps and found that all studied apps contained questionable location trackers. Digital Security Lab also conducted a study on Generation Z’s mental health, finding that 86% of Gen Z participants perceived that social media had a direct impact on their happiness.

A 2022 survey on remote workers found that 78% of employers digitally monitor their employees without staff knowledge.

See also
Comparison of virtual private network services

References

Notes

External links
ExpressVPN's official website

Internet privacy
Internet properties established in 2009
Virtual private network services
Computer security software companies
Information technology companies of the British Virgin Islands
YouTube sponsors